"I Get Along" is a song by the English rock band The Libertines, originally released as a B-side to their debut single "What a Waster" and later included as a final track on their debut album Up the Bracket. It was also released as a lead song on USA-only 5-track EP, featuring tracks from the band's various single releases.

Import version of the EP charted at number 99 in the UK.

Track listing
All songs written by Pete Doherty and Carl Barât.

References

The Libertines songs
2003 EPs
The Libertines albums
Rough Trade Records EPs